3/10 may refer to:
March 10 (month-day date notation)
October 3 (day-month date notation)
3rd Battalion, 10th Marines, an artillery battalion of the United States Marine Corps